Forza Italia (FI; translated to "Forward Italy" or "Let's Go Italy") was a centre-right political party in Italy with liberal-conservative, Christian-democratic, liberal (especially economically liberal), social-democratic and populist tendencies. Its leader was Silvio Berlusconi, who served as Prime Minister of Italy four times.

The party was founded in December 1993 and won its first general election soon afterwards in March 1994. It was the main member of the Pole of Freedoms/Pole of Good Government, Pole for Freedoms and House of Freedoms coalitions. Throughout its existence, the party was characterised by a strong reliance on the personal image and charisma of its leader (it has been called a "personality party" or Berlusconi's "personal party"), and the skillful use of media campaigns, especially via television. The party's organisation and ideology depended heavily on its leader. Its appeal to voters was based on Berlusconi's personality more than on its ideology or programme.

In November 2008, the national council of the party, presided by Alfredo Biondi, voted to merge Forza Italia into The People of Freedom (PdL), Berlusconi's new political vehicle, whose official foundation took place in March 2009. A new Forza Italia was established by Berlusconi as PdL's legal successor in 2013.

History

Foundation (1993–1994)
 
Forza Italia was formed in 1993 by Silvio Berlusconi, a successful businessman and owner of four of the main private television stations in Italy, along with Antonio Martino, Mario Valducci, Antonio Tajani, Marcello Dell'Utri, Cesare Previti and Giuliano Urbani.

Italy was shaken by a series of corruption scandals known as Tangentopoli and the subsequent police investigation, called Mani pulite. This led to the disappearance of the five parties which governed Italy from 1947: DC, PSI, PSDI, PLI and PRI (they formed a successful five-party coalition called Pentapartito from 1983 to 1991, and then governed without PRI from 1991 to 1994) and to the end of the so-called First Republic.

Forza Italia's aim was to attract moderate voters who were "disoriented, political orphans and who risked being unrepresented" (as Berlusconi described them), especially if the Democratic Party of the Left (the direct heirs of the Italian Communist Party) had been able to win the next election and enter in government for the first time since 1947.

The establishment of Forza Italia was supported in terms of finance, personnel and logistics by Berlusconi's Fininvest corporation: The area managers of its advertisement branch Publitalia '80 (managed by Dell'Utri) organised the selection of FI candidates, its marketing network staffed the opinion research centre Diakron that surveyed the "market potential" of the new party and the financial intermediaries of Fininvest subsidiary Programma Italia encouraged the launch of Forza Italia clubs. The new party's campaigning was strongly dependent on Fininvest's TV stations and PR resources. This earned Forza Italia labels like "virtual", "plastic" or "business-firm party". In her 2001 study of the party, political scientist Emanuela Poli described Forza Italia as "a mere diversification of Fininvest in the political market". The case of Forza Italia was unprecedented as never before had a large political party been launched by a business corporation. Only slowly it transformed into a mass-membership organisation. It took four years until the first party congress was held. To extend its representation in different regions, FI often recruited established politicians of the "old" parties, mainly DC and PSI, who defected to the new party, bringing their local clientele with them.

FI's political programme was strongly influenced by the manifesto "In Search of Good Government" (Alla ricerca del buongoverno) authored in late 1993 by Giuliano Urbani who was then a political science professor at Milan's private Bocconi University and an occasional collaborator of Fininvest. It denounced corruption, dominance of political parties and remnants of communism as Italy's ills, while advocating market economy, the assertion of civil society and more efficient politics as the solutions. In a couple of months Forza Italia became one of the leading Italian parties, achieving a large consensus through an accurate strategy of communication and pounding electoral spots aired by the Mediaset TV channels.

A short stint in power (1994–1995)

A few months after its creation, Forza Italia came to national power after the 1994 general election as the head of a political coalition called Pole of Freedoms/Pole of Good Government, composed of Lega Nord, National Alliance, Christian Democratic Centre and Union of the Centre.

Silvio Berlusconi was sworn in May 1994 as Prime Minister of Italy in a government in which the most important cabinet posts were held by fellow Forza Italia members: Antonio Martino was 
Foreign Minister, Cesare Previti Defence Minister, Alfredo Biondi Justice Minister and Giulio Tremonti (at the time an independent member of Parliament) Finance Minister.

In the 1994 European Parliament election held in June, Forza Italia was placed first nationally, with 30.6% of the vote, electing 27 MEPs. The party did not join an existing group in the European Parliament, instead forming the new group Forza Europa, composed entirely of Forza Italia MEPs.

The first Berlusconi-led government had a short life and fell in December, when Lega Nord left the coalition, after disagreements over pension reform and the first avviso di garanzia (preliminary notice of an investigation) for Berlusconi, passed by Milan prosecutors. Forza Italia's leader was replaced as Prime Minister by Lamberto Dini, an independent politician who had been the administration's Treasury Minister. No members of Forza Italia joined the new government and the party leader was relegated to opposition. However, the party obtained substantial successes in the 1995 Italian regional elections, both in the North (winning in Piedmont, Lombardy and Veneto) and the South (Campania, Apulia and Calabria).

Five years of opposition (1996–2001)
In 1996 the Pole for Freedoms coalition led by Forza Italia lost that year's general election and began what Berlusconi called "the crossing of the desert", something that could have proved fatal for such a young and unstructured party. Between 1996 and 1998, the party started to strengthen its organisation under Claudio Scajola, a former Christian Democrat who served as national coordinator of Forza Italia from 1996 to 2001.

In December 1999, Forza Italia gained full membership in the European People's Party, of which Antonio Tajani, the party leader of Forza Italia in the European Parliament, became a Vice President. In the same year, the party scored well (25.2% of votes) in the European Parliament election of 1999.

In the Italian regional elections of 2000, the Pole for Freedoms, with the support of Lega Nord, won in eight out of fifteen regions (all the most populous ones, except for Campania), while three members of Forza Italia were re-elected as presidents of the Region in Piedmont (Enzo Ghigo), Lombardy (Roberto Formigoni), and Veneto (Giancarlo Galan), together with three more elected for the first time in Liguria (Sandro Biasotti), Apulia (Raffaele Fitto) and Calabria (Giuseppe Chiaravalloti).

The party regained power in the general election of 2001, gaining 29.4% of the votes with Giorgio La Malfa's tiny Italian Republican Party, in a new coalition called House of Freedoms (CdL) and composed mainly of the National Alliance, Lega Nord, Christian Democratic Centre and United Christian Democrats (the last two parties merged in 2002 to form the Union of Christian and Centre Democrats, UDC).

Five years in government (2001–2006)

In June 2001, after the huge success in May elections, Silvio Berlusconi was returned head of the Italian government, the longest-serving cabinet in the history of the Italian republic. Again all key ministerial posts were given to Forza Italia members: Interior (Claudio Scajola 2001–2002, Giuseppe Pisanu 2002–2006), Defence (Antonio Martino 2001–2006), Finance (Giulio Tremonti, 2001–2004 and 2005–2006), Industry (Antonio Marzano 2001–2005, Claudio Scajola 2005–2006) and Foreign Affairs (Franco Frattini, 2002–2004). Additionally, National Alliance leader Gianfranco Fini was appointed Deputy Prime Minister and Foreign Minister from 2004 to 2006, while Roberto Castelli, senior figure of Lega Nord was Justice Minister from 2001 to 2006.

In 2004 European elections, Forza Italia was second place nationally, receiving 20.1% of the vote and returning 16 MEPs.

In national office, the government's popularity kept declining steadily year after year. Regional elections in April 2005 were a serious blow for the party, which however remained strong in the northern regions, such as Lombardy and Veneto, and somewhere in the South, where Sicily was a stronghold. After this disappointing electoral performance the cabinet was reshuffled, due to the insistence of the Union of Christian and Centre Democrats's leaders, and Berlusconi formed his third cabinet.

During his five years in office, Berlusconi government passed a series of reforms: a pension system reform, a labour market reform, a judiciary reform and a constitutional reform – the latter rejected by a referendum in June 2006. In foreign policy he shifted the country's position to more closeness to the United States, while in economic policy he was not able to deliver the tax cuts he had openly promised throughout all 2001 electoral campaign.

Toward The People of Freedom (2006–2009)

In the 2006 general election the party was present with a slightly different logo, with the words "Berlusconi President" (Berlusconi Presidente). It was the only party to use the word "President" in its logo. In the election for the Chamber of Deputies, FI scored 23.7% and 137 seats, in those for the Senate 24.0%, without counting Trentino-Alto Adige, whose seats were contested on first-past-the-post basis and which is a left-wing stronghold, due to its alliance with the autonomist South Tyrolean People's Party). The incumbent Berlusconi-led government narrowly lost to The Union coalition, which returned Romano Prodi as Prime Minister, relegating Forza Italia and its House of Freedoms allies to opposition.

On 31 July 2007 Berlusconi's protegee and possible successor Michela Vittoria Brambilla registered the name and the logo of the "Freedom Party" (Partito della Libertà) apparently with Berlusconi's backing. On 18 November, after Forza Italia claimed to have collected the signatures of more than 7 million Italians (including Umberto Bossi) against Romano Prodi's second government to ask the President of the Republic Giorgio Napolitano to call a fresh election, Berlusconi announced that Forza Italia would have soon merged or transformed into The People of Freedom (PdL) party.

After the sudden fall of the Prodi II Cabinet on 24 January 2008, the break-up of The Union coalition and the subsequent political crisis paving the way towards a new general election, Berlusconi hinted on 25 January that Forza Italia would have probably contested its final election and the new party would have been officially founded after that election. In an atmosphere of reconciliation with Gianfranco Fini, Berlusconi also stated that the new party could have seen the participation of other parties. Finally, on 8 February, Berlusconi and Fini agreed to form a joint list under the banner of "The People of Freedom", allied with Lega Nord. In the 2008 general election the PdL won 37.4% and a majority in both chambers, thanks to the alliance with Lega Nord (8.3%). Soon after the election Berlusconi formed his fourth government.

On 21 November 2008 the national council of the party, presided over by Alfredo Biondi and attended by Berlusconi himself, officially decided the dissolution of Forza Italia into The People of Freedom (PdL), whose official foundation took place on 27 March 2009.

Revival (2013)

In June 2013 Berlusconi announced the upcoming revival of Forza Italia, and the transformation of the People of Freedom into a centre-right coalition. The modern-day Forza Italia was launched on 18 September 2013 and the PdL was dissolved into the new party on 16 November 2013.

Ideology

Forza Italia was a centre-right party, formed mainly by former members of Christian Democracy,  the Italian Socialist Party and the Italian Liberal Party. The ideology of the party ranged from libertarianism to social democracy (often referred to as "liberal socialism" in Italy), including elements of the Catholic social teaching and the social market economy. The party was a member of the European People's Party (EPP) and presented itself as the party of renewal and modernization. The core values of Forza Italia were "freedom" and the "centrality of the individual". From a comparative perspective the ideology of Forza Italia has been characterized as liberal conservative, or conservative liberal, national conservative, and liberal.

Alessandro Campi has written that "the political culture of Forza Italia – a curious and, on many respects, untold mixture of 'liberalism' and 'democratic populism' – deserves to be described as an 'anti-ideological ideology', ... as a synthesis or fusion of very diverse political families and traditions (from liberal Catholicism to social conservatism, from reformist socialism to economic liberalism), kept together by the mobilizing appeal to 'freedom'." Chiara Moroni, who explains Forza Italia's ideology as a mixture of liberal, Christian-democratic and social-democratic values (united in the concept of "popular liberalism" in party documents), wrote that "Berlusconi offered to voters liberal values through a populist style" and that "Forza Italia has made the liberal political ideal popular" among voters, so that "it was spread and shared by broad and heterogenous sectors of the Italian population".

The electoral base of Forza Italia was highly heterogeneous and the ideological differences among its voters are explained also by its different regional constituencies; while voters from the North tended to support the original libertarian line of the party, voters from the South tended to be more statist. Both its Northern strongholds (Lombardy and Veneto) and its Southern strongholds (Sicily and Apulia) were once dominated by the Christian Democracy party; while in the South most leading members of Forza Italia are former Christian Democrats, the party was highly influenced also by liberals in the North.

Forza Italia claimed to be a fresh new party, with no ties with the last governments of the so-called First Republic, and at the same time to be the heir of the best political traditions of Italy: Christian Democrat Alcide De Gasperi, Social Democrat Giuseppe Saragat, Liberal Luigi Einaudi and Republican Ugo La Malfa were considered as party icons.

The "Secular Creed", that was also the preamble to the party's constitution, described the party in this way: 

Forza Italia presented itself as a bridge between Catholics and non-Catholics, who have been previously divided in the political system of the First Republic, and "the union of three political-cultural areas: that of liberal and popular Catholicism, that of secular, liberal and republican humanism and that of liberal socialism". In a speech during a party congress in 1998, Berlusconi himself proclaimed: "our liberal vision of the State is perfectly in agreement with the Catholic social teaching".

The "Secular Creed" of the party explains that FI was a party that primarily underlined freedom and the centrality of the individual, which are basic principles of both liberalism and the Catholic social teaching, often connected in party official documents: 

In 2008 Berlusconi stated that:

Sandro Bondi, a leading member of the party, wrote:

The party included also non-Catholic members, but they were a minority, and it was less secular in its policies than Christian Democratic Union of Germany. The party usually gave to its members freedom of conscience on moral issues (and hence a free vote), as in the case of the referendum on stem-cell research, but leading members of the party, including Silvio Berlusconi, Giulio Tremonti and Marcello Pera (who is himself non-Catholic, although friend of Pope Benedict XVI), spoke in favour of "abstention" (as asked by the Catholic Church, to not surpass the 50% of turnout needed for making the referendum legally binding). While Pera campaigned hard for the success of the boycott along with most FI members, both Berlusconi and Tremonti explicitly said that "abstention" was their personal opinion, not the official one of the party.

The political scientist Giovanni Orsina has defined Berlusconism, as he terms the ideology of Forza Italia and its leader, as an "emulsion of populism and liberalism", more specifically right-liberalism. According to him, in the initial phase, both elements were represented about equally, only after 2000 pro-market liberal positions had receded in favour of more socially conservative ones. As the main ideologic themes of Berlusconism, Orsina identified the myth of the "good" civil society (as opposed to the state apparatus), a "friendly, minimal state" (providing services to citizens rather than regulating their lives), "hypopolitics" (i.e. the containment of political conflicts, after the hyper-politisation of Italian society during the "First Republic") and the identification of a "new virtuous elite". The concepts of a good civil society and hypopolitics were both liberal and populist; while the minimal state was a mainly liberal idea and the new virtuous elite a chiefly populist one. According to Orsina, Berlusconism sanctified "the people" that embodied all virtues while being "betrayed" by the (old) elites, a typical element of populist ideologies. However, Berlusconi viewed "the people" as a pluralistic and diverse collection of individuals, not an ethnically, historically and culturally homogeneous unit.

Members

Most members of the party were former Christian Democrats (DC): Giuseppe Pisanu (former member of the leftist faction of DC and Minister of Interior), Roberto Formigoni (President of Lombardy), Claudio Scajola (former Minister of the Interior and of Industry), Enrico La Loggia, Renato Schifani, Guido Crosetto, Raffaele Fitto, Giuseppe Gargani, Alfredo Antoniozzi, Giorgio Carollo, Giuseppe Castiglione, Francesco Giro, Luigi Grillo, Maurizio Lupi, Mario Mantovani, Mario Mauro, Osvaldo Napoli, Antonio Palmieri, Angelo Sanza, Riccardo Ventre and Marcello Vernola are only some remarkable examples.

Several members were former Socialists (PSI), as Giulio Tremonti (vice-president of the party and former Minister of Economy), Franco Frattini (Vice President of the European Commission), Fabrizio Cicchitto (national deputy-coordinator of the party), Renato Brunetta, Francesco Musotto, Amalia Sartori, Paolo Guzzanti and Margherita Boniver. Berlusconi himself was a close friend of Bettino Craxi, leader of the PSI, in spite of his own Christian Democratic and Liberal background (Berlusconi was a DC activist in occasion of the 1948 general election).

Many were former Liberals (PLI), Republicans (PRI) and Social Democrats (PSDI): Alfredo Biondi (president of Forza Italia's national council) and Raffaele Costa, both former PLI leaders, and former PSDI leader Carlo Vizzini were later MPs for Forza Italia. Also Antonio Martino and Giancarlo Galan were formers Liberals, Jas Gawronski was a leading Republican, while Marcello Pera has a Socialist and Radical background.

Even some former Communists were leading members of the party, such as national party coordinator Sandro Bondi and Ferdinando Adornato.

Factions

Members of Forza Italia were divided in factions, which were sometimes mutable and formed over the most important political issues, despite previous party allegiances; however, it is possible to distinguish some patterns. The party was divided over ethical (between social conservatives and progressives), economic (between social democrats and some Christian democrats on one side and liberals on the other one), and institutional issues.

Regarding the latter issue, generally speaking, northern party members were staunch proposers of political and fiscal federalism, and autonomy for the Regions (in some parts of Veneto and Lombardy, it was sometimes difficult to distinguish a member of FI from a member of the LN), while those coming from the South were more cold on the issue. Also some former Liberals, due to their role of unifiers of Italy in the 19th century, were more centralist.

A scheme of the internal factions within Forza Italia could be this:
Liberals. Supporters of free markets, deregulation, economic freedoms, civil rights and, in general, personal responsibility and freedom. This group was basically formed by two wings: classical liberals (former members of the Italian Liberal Party, most of them organised in Popular Liberalism, as Alfredo Biondi, Raffaele Costa, Egidio Sterpa and Enrico Nan); former Socialists, as Renato Brunetta and Paolo Guzzanti; others like Stefania Prestigiacomo and Simone Baldelli) and libertarians, as Antonio Martino (ex-PLI), Dario Rivolta, Benedetto Della Vedova (ex-Radical) and his Liberal Reformers. The latter were more staunchly pro-United States than the former and supported the idea of transforming Italy into a federal State.
Liberal-centrists. They were more moderate than Martino and Della Vedova on economic issues, and more socially conservative on ethical issues, although not being totally sided with the Catholic Church. To this broad group belonged people of various origin: former Socialists (as Giulio Tremonti, Franco Frattini, Giampiero Cantoni, Amalia Sartori and Jole Santelli), former Republicans (as Luigi Casero, Denis Verdini and Donato Bruno), former Liberals (as Giancarlo Galan, Giuseppe Vegas and Paolo Romani), some former liberal Christian Democrats (Giuseppe Cossiga and Basilio Germanà) and many others (as Giorgio Jannone, Antonio Leone, Gianfranco Micciché and Aldo Brancher). They were strong in Northern Italy and strong supporters of political and fiscal federalism.
Christian democrats. They believed in the social market economy model and were supporters of Catholic stances over ethical issues. Most former members of Christian Democracy were identifiable with this tendency (from Roberto Formigoni to Giuseppe Pisanu, from Claudio Scajola to Enrico La Loggia, from Guido Crosetto to Angelo Sanza, from Maurizio Lupi to Giuseppe Gargani, from Antonio Palmieri to Mario Mantovani), but also ex-Communists, such as Sandro Bondi and Fernando Adornato, and an ex-Socialist as Gianni Baget Bozzo, a Catholic priest who was in charge of cultural formation, fitted the category, along with former Liberals, as Isabella Bertolini. Some were more socially conservative than others (for example Formigoni and theoconservatives like Marcello Pera) and many of them were close to Giulio Tremonti, indeed this group and that described before were very close on most political issues, so that the two factions were often undistinguishable. They are probably the most europeanist wing of the party, along with former Socialists, but many of them were also the most atlanticists within it, as Adornato and Pera. In 2007 Adornato, Pisanu and Formigoni launched a faction named Liberal-Popular Union, but, the faction soon was disbanded as Adornato left Forza Italia to join UDC. Formigoni had also his own group, Network Italy, mainly composed of Catholics active in Communion and Liberation, to which group both Crosetto and Fitto showed closeness.
Social democrats. The most progressive wing of the party, especially about ethical issues. They were basically former Socialists, as Fabrizio Cicchitto, Francesco Colucci, Maurizio Sacconi, Margherita Boniver, Giorgio Stracquadanio, Chiara Moroni and Stefania Craxi, or former Social Democrats, as Carlo Vizzini, Nicola Cosentino and Paolo Russo. They considered themselves the true heirs of Pietro Nenni, Giuseppe Saragat and Bettino Craxi, continued to declare themselves 'Socialists' and were sided with Silvio Berlusconi's centre-right because they saw the Italian centre-left as too hegemonised by the Democrats of the Left, heir of the Italian Communist Party, which was the harshest rival of the Italian Socialists from the Fifties to the Nineties. Forza Italia's social democrats were organised into four sub-factions: We Blue Reformers, Free Foundation, Young Italy and the Clubs of Reformist Initiative.

Christian democrats and liberal-centrists were undoubtedly the strongest factions within the party, but all four were mainstream for a special issue: for example liberals and liberal-centrists were highly influential over economic policy, Christian democrats led the party over ethical issues (although there was a substantial minority promoting a more progressive outlook), while social democrats had their say in defining the party's policy over labour market reform and, moreover, it is thanks to this group (and to those around Tremonti, he himself a former Socialist) that constitutional reform was at the top of Forza Italia's political agenda. It is difficult to say to what faction Berlusconi was closer, what is sure is that his political record was a synthesis of all the political tendencies within the party.

Internal structure

Before being merged into the PdL, Forza Italia had a president (currently Silvio Berlusconi), two vice-presidents (Giulio Tremonti and Roberto Formigoni), a presidential committee (presided by Claudio Scajola) and a national council (presided by Alfredo Biondi).

The president was the party's leader, but a national coordinator was in charge of internal organisation and day-to-day political activity, similarly to the secretary-general in many European parties. Moreover, the party had thematic departments and regional, provincial or metropolitan coordination boards plus many affiliate clubs (Club Azzurro) all over Italy.

FI is considered a prototypical example of the business-firm party, in that it was strongly centered on Berlusconi, who had created the party to further his own private interests.

It has been claimed that Forza Italia had no internal democracy because there was no way of changing the leader of the party from below (although the party's constitution makes it possible). Key posts in the party structure were appointed by Berlusconi or by his delegates. Forza Italia's organisation was based on the idea of a "party of the elected people", giving more importance to the whole electorate than to party's members.

Party national-level conventions did not have normally elections to choose the party leadership (although the national congress elected some members of the national council), and they seemed to be more like events arranged for propaganda purposes. However, Berlusconi was highly popular among his party fellows, and it was unlikely he could have been overthrown if such an election had occurred.

Within the party there was a long debate over organisation. The original idea was the so-called "light party" (partito leggero), intended to be different from Italian traditional, bureaucratic and self-referential, party machines. This was the line of the early founders of the party, notably Marcello Dell'Utri and Antonio Martino. However Claudio Scajola and most former Christian Democrats supported a more capillary-based organisation, to make participate as much people as possible, and a more collegial, participative and democratic decision-making process.

In a 1999 study, political scientists Jonathan Hopkin and Caterina Paolucci likened the organisational model of the party to that of a business firm, describing it as having "a lightweight organisation with the sole basic function of mobilising short-term support at election time". Several other authors have adopted this comparison, and have labeled Berlusconi as a "political entrepreneur".

Given the perceived use of government responsibility to advance Berlusconi's personal and Fininvest's business interests during the period of Forza Italia-led government, the political scientist Patrick McCarthy in 1995 proposed to describe Forza Italia as a "clan" rather than a reform-minded political party. In 2004, ten years after the emergence of the party and during its second term in government, Mark Donovan summarised that this still might be an accurate description. He asserted that the party (and the centre-right camp) was only coherent and disciplined when it came to questions that strongly concerned Berlusconi, while he allowed great liberties to the diverse factions in other issues that did not concern his personal interests.

Distinctive traits

From its inception, Forza Italia used unconventional means in regards to European politics. Forza Italia’s methods more closely resembled the American model, and utilized methods such as: stickering, SMS messaging, and mass-mailing of campaign material. This additionally included the widespread distribution of Berlusconi‘s biography, which was titled "An Italian Story" (Una storia italiana).

The party was heavily dependent on the image surrounding Berlusconi's personality. The party's anthem was sung in karaoke fashion at American-style conventions. There was nominally no internal opposition (although some critical voices raised up, such as those of Senators Paolo Guzzanti and Raffaele Iannuzzi). The party used TV advertising extensively, although this was slightly restricted following 2000 by a law passed by the centre-left majority of the time.

European affiliation
Following its first European election in 1994, Forza Italia MEPs formed their own political group in the European Parliament called Forza Europa. In 1995, Forza Europa merged with the European Democratic Alliance to form the Union for Europe group alongside the Rally for the Republic of France and Fianna Fáil of Ireland. Following an abandoned attempt to form a European political party with Rally for the Republic in 1997, on 10 June 1998 Forza Italia was accepted into the  
Group of the European People's Party. In December 1999 Forza Italia was finally granted full membership of the European People's Party (EPP).

Popular support
The electoral results of FI in general (Chamber of Deputies) and European Parliament elections since 1994 are shown in the chart below.

The electoral results of Forza Italia in the 10 most populated regions of Italy are shown in the table below.

Electoral results

Italian Parliament

European Parliament

Leadership
President: Silvio Berlusconi (1994–2009)
Vice President: Giulio Tremonti (2004–2009), Roberto Formigoni (2008–2009)
Spokesperson: Antonio Tajani (1994–1996), Paolo Bonaiuti (1996–2001), Sandro Bondi (2001–2004), Elisabetta Gardini (2004–2008), Daniele Capezzone (2008–2009)
President of the President's Committee: Claudio Scajola (2004–2009)
Vice President of the President's Committee: Carlo Vizzini (2005–2009)
President of the National Council: Alfredo Biondi (2004–2009)
Coordinator: Domenico Mennitti (1994), Luigi Caligaris (1994), Cesare Previti (1994–1996), Claudio Scajola (1996–2001), Roberto Antonione (2001–2003), Claudio Scajola (2003), Sandro Bondi (2003–2008), Denis Verdini (2008–2009)
Deputy-Coordinator: Giuliano Urbani / Mario Valducci (1995–1996), Fabrizio Cicchitto (2003–2009), Gianfranco Micciché (2004–2009), Renato Brunetta (2007–2009), Gian Carlo Abelli (2008–2009)
Treasurer: Mario Valducci (1994–1995), Domenico Lo Jucco (1995–1997), Giovanni Dell'Elce (1997–2003), Rocco Crimi (2003–2009)
Party Leader in the Chamber of Deputies: Raffaele Della Valle (1994), Vittorio Dotti (1994–1996), Giuseppe Pisanu (1996–2001), Elio Vito (2001–2008), Fabrizio Cicchitto (leader of PdL's group, 2008–2009)
Party Leader in the Senate: Enrico La Loggia (1994–2001), Renato Schifani (2001–2008), Gaetano Quagliariello (deputy leader of PdL's group, 2008–2009)
Party Leader in the European Parliament: Giancarlo Ligabue (1994–1997), Claudio Azzolini (1997–1999), Antonio Tajani (1999–2009)

Symbols

Bibliography

Notes

References

External links

Chart of Values
Chart of Values – Key Ideas
Secular Creed of Forza Italia

2009 disestablishments in Italy
Christian democratic parties in Italy
Catholic political parties
Liberal conservative parties
Liberal parties in Italy
Social conservative parties
Political parties established in 1993
Political parties disestablished in 2009
Conservative parties in Italy
1993 establishments in Italy
Defunct political parties in Italy
Defunct liberal political parties